Ana Paula Arendt (born 1980), pseudonym of R. P. Alencar, is a writer, a poet, and a Brazilian diplomat. She is an author of children books, of screenplays, and of poem collections in Portuguese, English, Spanish, French, and other languages. She published Veritas Filia Mendacii Est and To Freedom. Among her most recent works are the awarded play in classical verse The Constituent, the awarded epithalamium "The Venerable Virtues of Man", Poetry reunited (2014-2018), among other books. Editor of books and magazines, especially Itapuan Poetry Magazine, bilingual publication in Portuguese and French. Recently elected for the Lisbon Academy of Science, Class of Letters, as associate and foreign correspondent, member of the New York Academy of Sciences, and admitted in the Brazilian Veteran Naval Fusiliers Association.  She's hepta-granddaughter of D. Barbara de Alencar.

She was born and raised in Rondonia. She has lived and moved across many cities of Rondonia, when she was a child, and also in Rio Branco, Acre, where she spent some time at the Kaxarari tribe. Then she moved to Brasilia, and São Paulo, where she settled. As a diplomat, she served in short missions in Geneva, Lisbon, Mexico, and Santiago, and during longer missions in Montevideo, Togo (West Africa), and Honduras (Central America).

Works

Marginal poetry
Veritas Filia Mendacii Est ("A Verdade é Filha da Mentira", Rio de Janeiro, Azougue Editorial, 2014)
To Freedom ("Rumo à Liberdade", Rio de Janeiro, Azougue Editorial, 2014)

Individual poems
"I love in Portuguese", Literature Today, Vol. 4
"Shrine", Literature Today, Vol. 5
"A child's chide", Literature Today, Vol. 6
"Endless", The Muse, June 2017.
"Céu de Brasília". Correio Braziliense, 11/04/2017.
"Um estudo sobre os homens violentos". Correio Braziliense, 19/09/2017 (sobre decisão proferida pela Vara Especial contra Violência Doméstica de Guarulhos-SP).
"Um estudo sobre o propósito III". Correio Braziliense, 22/12/2017
"Maestra". In: Poesias Contemporâneas IV, org. Thais Matarazzo. Editora Matarazzo, dezembro de 2017. (Homenagem à Professora Heley, falecida em Janaúba). 
"Três estudos sobre o imaterial". In: Mallamargens, Revista de Poesia e Arte Contemporânea, vol. 6, n°. 8, abril de 2018. 
"Un sonnet pour un homme".  18º. Salon du Livre et des Cultures de Luxemburg, du 2 au 4 mars 2018.
"Un étude sur le courage".  Salon du Livre de Genève, 25 avril 2018, stand G761. 
 "A study on purpose III". In: New Brazilian poems - a bilingual anthology after Elizabeth Bishop. Edited and translated by Abhay K. Ibis libris Editora, 17 de janeiro de 2019.

Classical poetry/theatre
The Constituent (2015, Portuguese, Martins Pena Award)
 Peer-review by Fernando Marques, Professor of Theater at the University of Brasília
 Peer-review by Ambassador João Almino
Callista (Portuguese, English, Chinese, French, Spanish, Latin, 2015)
The Creation of Pindorama (Portuguese, 2015)
The Venerable Virtues of Men (Portuguese, 2016). Maraã Prize of Poetry 2016, Honor Mention. Editora Chiado, 2018.
 Peer review by poet Celso de Alencar
 Peer review by the President of the Academy of Sciences and Class of Letters of Lisbon, Dr. Artur Anselmo
Poesia Reunida 2014-2018. (Portuguese, 2019). Só Livro Bom Editora, 2018, 312 p.

Marginal fiction
Brasil Encantado (Portuguese, 3 vols) - Monastery, Gorender Expedition, Ministry (2013)
Thirty Bucks to the Devil (Portuguese, 2014) (vetoed by her brothers jesuits)

Poetry written in other languages
Penthesilea (English, 2014).
"Suele Ser Así" (Spanish, 2016).
"Almost Sonnets" (English, 2016). 
"Wo de Long" (Chinese, 2016).

Translations
Memories of the Prince of Talleyrand, vol 1. (Portuguese, 2015)
" "Brasília", de Abhay K. Kumar. Correio Braziliense, 28/03/2017. "Poesia e Sonhos", de Abhay K. Kumar, Correio Braziliense, 29/06/2017. "Uma noite no Amazonas", de Abhay K. Kumar.,Correio Braziliense, 09/08/2017 "Pandu, o massagista em Goa", de Abhay K. Kumar, Correio Braziliense, 29/08/2017, "Diversos poemas de Abhay K.", em Musa Rara, 27/04/2017. And many others. 
"The art of political lying", Jonathan Swift
"Les enfants du Brésil", Kangni Alem.

Essays
The Simple Things of Life (Portuguese, 2016)

Coluna Terra à Vista, Observatório de Comunicação Institucional (OCI). 
"As tantas flores do Tejo". 30 de junho de 2018
"Mátria lusa". 30 de julho de 2018. 
"Os bons humores do Mediterrâneo". 30 de agosto de 2018. 
"Assimilar a civilização brasileira". 30 de setembro de 2018. 
"A fé e a razão brasileira neste princípio de século XXI". 30 de outubro de 2018. 
"Um mapa para encontrar o Ocidente". 30 de novembro de 2018. 
"Uma reflexão sobre os direitos da mulher comum". 30 de dezembro de 2018. 
And many others. 

Diane Magazine, 005, Juin 2018 (First magazine for women in Togo).
"Si la France avait découvert le Brésil", Diane Magazine 005, Juin 2018. 
"J'aime être Brésilienne", Diane Magazine 006, Juillet 2018. 
"Imaginer et travailler pour un monde plus amoureux", Diane Magazine 007, Août 2018. 
"Trouver un esprit géant", Diane Magazine 008, Septembre 2018. 
"Quand on trouve l'amour, et l'amour ne nous trouve pas", Diane Magazine 008, Septembre 2018.
"Les défis du pouvoir et les périls du radicalisme", Diane Magazine 010, Décembre 2018. 
"Le bonheur féminin d’occuper les mains", Diane Magazine 011, Janvier 2019. 
"Les singularités nationales des femmes", Diane Magazine 012, Février 2019.
And many others. 

 Jornal da Associação Nacional de Escritores 

Uma longa era de paz e de liberdade, Jornal ANE nº 86, Junho de 2018.

Screenplays
 "The Utopia" (English, 2013)
"99 Noms de Dieu" (French, 2016)

Children's fiction and poetry
The House of Mommy Marmoset (Portuguese, French, 2014) (A Casa da Mamãe Macaquinho, Selo Só Livro Bom) 
The Complete Story of the Three Wise Kings (Portuguese, 2013)
The King and the Fairy (Portuguese, 2013)
Convention of the Rights of Birds and Nestlings (Portuguese, 2014)
The Breeze and the Wind (Portuguese, 2015) (A Brisa e o Vento, Selo Só Livro Bom).
"The opera of the ant", with J. D. P. Alencar (Portuguese, 2019)
"Botanical Fables". (Portuguese, 2020). 
 Peer-review by Ambassador João Almino
 Peer-review by poet Ana Maria Lopes

Almost all her books are available for free download at the Official website in .pdf.

Poetry debates and declamations
"5 Poets Meeting around nowhere", National Library, Brasilia, 29 March 2016.
With Davino Sena (Prêmio Fundação Nestlé de Cultura, 1991), Antonio Miranda (Diretor da Biblioteca Nacional de Brasília) Ambassador Raul de Taunay (medalha João Ribeiro, da ABL), Anderson Braga Horta (Diretor Legislativo da Câmara dos Deputados, Prêmio Jabuti, 2001), and Maestro Airan d'Sousa ("Nuestra América", Cúpula do Mercosul, 2010). 

"The rumbhs of lusophone poetry", Livraria Ferin, Lisbon, 8 November 2018
With Fred Maia (poet and former advisor of former Brazilian Minister of Culture Gilberto Gil), Dr. João Paulo Dias Pinheiro (representing the historical Library Ferin), and Dr. Artur Anselmo (President of the Academy of Sciences and Class of Letters in Lisbon 

And many other workshops.

References

Sources
Page at the Brazilian National Association of Writers
 Azougue Editorial A Verdade é Filha da Mentira
 Azougue Editorial Rumo à Liberdade
Editora Chiado As Veneráveis Virtudes do Homem
Database Poesia iberoamericana ANA PAULA ARENDT

External links

Literature Today: An International Journal of Contemporary Literature (Volume 4)

*Literature Today: An International Journal of Contemporary Literature (Volume 5)

Living people
Brazilian women dramatists and playwrights
Brazilian women poets
1980 births
Writers from São Paulo
People from Rondônia
21st-century Brazilian poets
21st-century Brazilian women writers
Brazilian women diplomats
21st-century Brazilian dramatists and playwrights
21st-century pseudonymous writers
Pseudonymous women writers